Aurelia Cäcilia Katharina Frick commonly known as Aurelia Frick (born 19 September 1975) is a Liechtensteiner politician who served as Minister of Foreign Affairs, Education and Culture from 2009 until 2019.

Early life and education
Aurelia Frick was born in St. Gallen, Switzerland. From 1995 to 1999, Frick studied Law at the University of Fribourg. She was admitted to the Bar of the Canton of Zürich in 2004. In 2005, she received her Doctor of Law from University of Basel.

Career 
Between 2001 and 2003 she was working as an auditor at the district court of Zurich in civil, labor, tenancy and criminal law. She received a doctorate from the University of Basel, with a thesis on "The Termination of the Mandate", and passed the bar examination in the Swiss Canton of Zurich. After graduation, Frick worked at a Zurich law firm, and then as legal director for a London-based human resources company. From November 2006 she worked as a consultant for Bjørn Johansson Associates, an executive search company. Part-time she was working as an associate professor at the University of Liechtenstein. She briefly worked for the hedge fund K2.

Frick has started her independent advisory practice, UNLOCK Advisory, in Vaduz after resignation as a minister.

Politics 
Frick, a member of the Progressive Citizens' Party in Liechtenstein (Fortschrittliche Bürgerpartei in Liechtenstein, or FBP), was at age 34 appointed to the ministerial justice, foreign affairs, and cultural affairs portfolios following the March 2009 parliamentary election in Liechtenstein. Frick became one of Liechtenstein's five ministers, and one of two women in the cabinet. She was expected, on appointment, to pursue reforms of Liechtenstein's civil and criminal law.

After the 2013 parliamentary election, Frick was appointed to serve under the new government Prime Minister Adrian Hasler as head of the ministry of Foreign Affairs, Education and Culture.

Causa Frick 
On 2 July 2019 the parliament of Liechtenstein concluded a motion of no confidence against Aurelia Frick. After the reigning prince, Alois of Liechtenstein, confirmed her dismissal the same day, Frick lost her office as government minister.

Personal life 
In 2011, Frick married Oliver Muggli, a Swiss financier and former banker. Muggli is currently a partner of 1291 Private Office, a financial services company, based in Liechtenstein. 

They have two children and reside in Vaduz.

See also
List of current foreign ministers

References

External links 
Aurelia Frick at the official website of the government of Liechtenstein.

1975 births
Female foreign ministers
Liechtenstein lawyers
Living people
Progressive Citizens' Party politicians
Culture ministers of Liechtenstein
Education ministers of Liechtenstein
Foreign ministers of Liechtenstein
Justice ministers of Liechtenstein
Women government ministers of Liechtenstein
People from St. Gallen (city)
University of Fribourg alumni
21st-century women politicians
Liechtenstein women diplomats
20th-century Liechtenstein politicians
20th-century Liechtenstein women
21st-century Liechtenstein politicians
21st-century Liechtenstein women
People from Vaduz
Female justice ministers
Swiss emigrants to Liechtenstein